2015 in professional wrestling describes the year's events in the world of professional wrestling.

List of notable promotions 
These promotions held notable shows in 2015.

Calendar of notable shows

January

February

March

April

May

June

July

August

September

October

November

December

Notable events
August 31  WWE Performance Center shooting

Tournaments and accomplishments

AAA

Ring of Honor

Total Nonstop Action Wrestling

WWE

Title changes

AAA

NJPW

ROH

The Crash Lucha Libre

TNA

WWE

NXT

Awards and honors

AAA Hall of Fame

Pro Wrestling Illustrated

TNA Hall of Fame

Wrestling Observer Newsletter

Wrestling Observer Newsletter Hall of Fame

Wrestling Observer Newsletter awards

WWE

WWE Hall of Fame

Slammy Awards

NXT Year-End Awards

Debuts

 February 13 – Kuma Arashi
 February 28 – Hyper Misao
 March 8 – Senza Volto
 May 6 – Flip Gordon
 May 7 – Nia Jax
 May 17 – Fuminori Abe
 May 31 
 Maika Ozaki
 Natsupoi
 Saori Anou
 Tae Honma
 June 25 – Liv Morgan
 July 12 – Mika Iwata
 August 23 
 Mao
 Mizuki Watase
 August 25 
 Mandy Rose
 Sara Lee 
 August 29 – Francesco Akira
 September 11 – Kaito Ishida
 November 1 – Ayato Yoshida
 December 22 – Nodoka Tenma
 December 30 – Sonya Deville

Retirements

 Brazo de Oro (1975–2015)
 Road Dogg (1986-2015 , became a WWE producer) 
 Mikey Whipwreck (1994–2015)
 AJ Lee (September 29, 2007 – April 3, 2015)
 Tomoka Nakagawa (September 19, 2004 – April 12, 2015)
 Takeshi Morishima (March 22, 1998 – April 21, 2015)
 El Matematico (1968-May 17, 2015) 
 Johnny Saint (1958-June 13, 2015) 
 David Otunga (May 29, 2009 - July 5, 2015) (became a color commentator)
 Serena Deeb (March 2005 - July 10, 2015) (returned in 2017 for the inaugural Mae Young Classic)
 Traci Brooks (2001 – July 18, 2015)
 Layla (August 16, 2006 – July 29, 2015)
 Jimmy Snuka (1968	– September 2015)
 Portia Perez (December 2003 – October 11, 2015)
 Ezekiel Jackson (June 27, 2007 – October 18, 2015)
 Mio Shirai (March 4, 2007 – September 20, 2015)
 Genichiro Tenryu (November 13, 1976 – November 15, 2015)
 Kid Kash (1990 – December 2015)
 Act Yasukawa (February 5, 2012 – December 23, 2015)
 Neko Nitta (March 2, 2011 – December 31, 2015)

Deaths 

 January 7 – Tim Arson, 38
 January 13 - Brutus Malumba, 92 
 January 27 – Larry Winters, 58
 February 9 – Drew McDonald, 59
 February 10 – Daniel Brand, 79
 February 13 - Tony Charles, 79
 February 14 - Wim Ruska, 74 
 March 4 – Iwao Horiuchi, 73
 March 20 – Cincinnati Red, 40
 March 21 – Perro Aguayo, Jr., 35
 April 5 – Steve Rickard, 85
 April 21 - Ron Wright, 76
 April 27 – Verne Gagne, 89
 April 28 - Ashura Hara, 68
 June 1:
Tommy Rogers, 54
Mike Lane, 82
 June 11 – Dusty Rhodes, 69
 June 21 – Cora Combs, 92
 June 22 – Buddy Landel, 52
 July 1 – Curly Moe, 53
 July 9 - Samoan Joe, 66
 July 31 – Roddy Piper, 61
 November 8 - Don Fargo, 84
 November 14 – Nick Bockwinkel, 80
 November 26 - Tommy Gilbert, 75
 November 28 - Stan Holek, 82
 December 5 – Hack Meyers, 41
 December 16 – Lizmark, 64
 December 21 – Emmanuel Yarbrough, 51

See also
List of GFW events and specials
List of NJPW pay-per-view events
List of ROH pay-per-view events
List of TNA pay-per-view events
List of WWE Network events
List of WWE pay-per-view events

References

 
professional wrestling